In mathematics, a palindromic prime (sometimes called a palprime) is a prime number that is also a palindromic number. Palindromicity depends on the base of the number system and its notational conventions, while primality is independent of such concerns. The first few decimal palindromic primes are:
2, 3, 5, 7, 11, 101, 131, 151, 181, 191, 313, 353, 373, 383, 727, 757, 787, 797, 919, 929, … 

Except for 11, all palindromic primes have an odd number of digits, because the divisibility test for 11 tells us that every palindromic number with an even number of digits is a multiple of 11.  It is not known if there are infinitely many palindromic primes in base 10. The largest known  is
101888529 - 10944264 - 1.
which has 1,888,529 digits, and was found on 18 October 2021 by Ryan Propper and Serge Batalov. On the other hand, it is known that, for any base, almost all palindromic numbers are composite, i.e. the ratio between palindromic composites and all palindromes below n tends to 1.

Other bases

In binary, the palindromic primes include the Mersenne primes and the Fermat primes. All binary palindromic primes except binary 11 (decimal 3) have an odd number of digits; those palindromes with an even number of digits are divisible by 3. The sequence of binary palindromic primes begins (in binary):
11, 101, 111, 10001, 11111, 1001001, 1101011, 1111111, 100000001, 100111001, 110111011, ... 

The palindromic primes in base 12 are: (using reversed two and three for ten and eleven, respectively)
2, 3, 5, 7, Ɛ, 11, 111, 131, 141, 171, 181, 1Ɛ1, 535, 545, 565, 575, 585, 5Ɛ5, 727, 737, 747, 767, 797, Ɛ1Ɛ, Ɛ2Ɛ, Ɛ6Ɛ, ...

Property

Due to the superstitious significance of the numbers it contains, the palindromic prime 1000000000000066600000000000001 is known as Belphegor's Prime, named after Belphegor, one of the seven princes of Hell. Belphegor's Prime consists of the number 666, on either side enclosed by thirteen zeroes and a one. Belphegor's Prime is an example of a beastly palindromic prime in which a prime p is palindromic with 666 in the center. Another beastly palindromic prime is 700666007.

Ribenboim defines a triply palindromic prime as a prime p for which: p is a palindromic prime with q digits, where q is a palindromic prime with r digits, where r is also a palindromic prime. For example, p = 1011310 + 4661664 + 1, which has q = 11311 digits, and 11311 has r = 5 digits. The first (base-10) triply palindromic prime is the 11-digit number 10000500001. It is possible that a triply palindromic prime in base 10 may also be palindromic in another base, such as base 2, but it would be highly remarkable if it were also a triply palindromic prime in that base as well.

Palindromic Prime in Decimal Expansion of Pi 
On June 8, 2022 Google cloud announced that they have calculated 100 Trillion digits of pi using y-cruncher on their cloud platform. The largest Palindromic prime appearing in the known decimal expansion of pi is 9609457639843489367549069.

See also 
 666 (number)

References 

Base-dependent integer sequences
Classes of prime numbers
Unsolved problems in mathematics
Palindromes